Spathulina biseuarestina is a species of tephritid or fruit flies in the genus Spathulina of the family Tephritidae.

Distribution
South Africa.

References

Tephritinae
Insects described in 1924
Diptera of Africa
Taxa named by Mario Bezzi